Alana Paon (born June 26, 1971) is a Canadian politician. She was elected to the Nova Scotia House of Assembly in the 2017 provincial election representing the electoral district of Cape Breton-Richmond. She was a member of the Progressive Conservative Association of Nova Scotia until ousted from Caucus on June 24, 2019, amid a long-standing dispute over accessibility to her constituency office in St. Peter's. Paon had threatened to fight a House of Assembly Management Commission order to pave the gravel lot near her office, saying it made her feel "bullied and harassed." Nova Scotia Tory leader Tim Houston called Paon's remarks "unfounded and mean-spirited".

Early life and education
Paon attended North Isle Madame Elementary and Isle Madame District High School. She then attended Dalhousie University studying Arts and Social Science, Adult Education and Architecture. She then graduated from Saint Mary's University with a degree in Community Economic Development. She graduated from Henson College with a certificate in Negotiation and Dispute Resolution.

Personal life

Paon is the mother of Canadian actor and film producer Gharrett Patrick Paon.

Electoral record

References

Acadian people
Living people
Progressive Conservative Association of Nova Scotia MLAs
Nova Scotia Independent MLAs
Women MLAs in Nova Scotia
21st-century Canadian politicians
21st-century Canadian women politicians
1971 births